The concept of inversion in postcolonial theory and subaltern studies refers to a discursive strategy which opposes or resists a dominant discourse by turning around its categories and re-enacting an asymmetrical relation with the terms the other way around.  The term can be used with positive, negative or neutral value-connotations.

Origins and uses

The term derives from studies of modalities of resistance by the Subaltern Studies school, but reflects concerns pervasive from the earliest days of post- and anti-colonial writing.  Ranajit Guha refers to inversion as one of the modalities of peasant revolt in colonial India, noting practices such as forcing landlords to carry peasants on Sedan chairs.  Frantz Fanon's The Wretched of the Earth (1961) provides an extensive discussion and partial advocacy of inversion in a social context defined by strong binaries.  A reversal of the coloniser's monopoly on violence is taken to be necessary to break out of the master–slave dialectic, a learnt sense of cultural inferiority and the learned helplessness of the colonised.  The term "inversion woodcuts" also appears in peasant studies as a description of imagery such as an ox killing a butcher (e.g. James Scott, Domination and the Arts of Resistance, 166-72).

The term has become useful as a way of theorising violence.  Definitions of terms such as racism and sexism are contested, and theorists who use structural or institutional definitions thus refuse to typify actions against members of structurally dominant groups by structurally subordinate groups, or prejudicial beliefs against members of dominant groups, with these terms.  Actions such as Palestinian suicide bombing, the 9/11 attacks, land reform in Zimbabwe, the writings and actions of Valerie Solanas and SCUM, and what are treated by the state as racially motivated crimes against white people, would be examples of cases where the term would be used.  Ward Churchill's essay On the Justice of Roosting Chickens is an example of this kind of analysis from an author sympathetic to inversion.

Attaching positive values to an essence of the oppressed, as in some black-consciousness and Afrocentric ideas, would also be an instance of inversion, especially to critics.  Edward Said argues against this inversion, suggesting that "in Post-colonial national states, the liabilities of such essences as the Celtic spirit, négritude, or Islam are clear: they have much to do not only with the native manipulators, who also use them to cover up contemporary faults, corruptions, tyrannies, but also with the embattled imperial contexts out of which they came and in which they were felt to be necessary" (Culture and Imperialism [1994] 16).

Inversion versus subversion

Theorists inspired by deconstruction, such as Gayatri Spivak and Homi Bhabha, criticise inversion as failing to overcome binaries.  Inversion is sometimes contrasted with "subversion", with the observation that subversion breaks down a binary whereas inversion retains it.  As Partha Bramerjee summarises the controversy in subaltern studies, "It appeared as if the consciousness of protest and resistance was always already implicated in the terms of the dominant discourses themselves, for inversion and negation had to depend on the continued existence of the dominant as the necessary Other."

Homi Bhabha asks: "Can the aim of freedom of knowledge be the simple inversion of the relation of oppressor and oppressed, centre and periphery, negative image and positive image?"  His answer is that hybridity is to a preferable strategy, "negotiation rather than negation".

This rejection of inversion is a source of contention between postcolonial theorists such as Spivak, Said and Bhabha, and identity-political anti-colonial theorists associated with Afrocentrism, black consciousness and various nationalisms.

References
Prathama Banerjee, review of Subaltern Studies X
Ward Churchill, Some People Push Back: On the Justice of Roosting Chickens
Howard Adelman, "Optimism and Pessimism in the Israeli-Palestinian Conflict
Homi Bhabha, excerpt from "The Commitment to Theory" and in The Location of Culture, pp.18-28.

Postcolonialism